Hintona is a village in the Nicobar district of Andaman and Nicobar Islands, India. It is located in the Nancowry tehsil.

Demographics 

According to the 2011 census of India, Hintona has 5 households. The effective literacy rate (i.e. the literacy rate of population excluding children aged 6 and below) is 66.67%. The village is inhabited by ethnic Nicobarese people.

References 

Villages in Nancowry tehsil